Aarre Klinga (born 28 March 1930, date of death unknown) was a Finnish footballer. He played in nine matches for the Finland national football team from 1953 to 1959. He was also named in Finland's squad for the Group 2 qualification tournament for the 1954 FIFA World Cup.

References

1930 births
Year of death missing
Finnish footballers
Finland international footballers
Place of birth missing
Association footballers not categorized by position